Agarpara railway station is a Kolkata Suburban Railway station and one of the oldest active railway station in the town of Agarpara. This railway station situates between the Belgharia railway station and Sodpur railway station. It serves the local areas of Agarpara in North 24 Parganas district, West Bengal, India.

It belongs to Sealdah Railway Division of Eastern Railway Zone of Indian Railways. This station provides rail services across its surrounding area. Trains approach for Ranaghat, Kalyani Simanta, Gede, Sealdah and Majerhat run through this station. Kolkata Suburban Railway serves local railway passenger trains at this station daily.

History
The Eastern Bengal Railway main line from Sealdah to Ranaghat was opened in 1862 and was further extended to Kushtia in present-day Bangladesh within two months. Eastern Bengal Railway used to work only on the eastern side of the Hooghly River.

Railway 
Agarpara railway station is located on the Sealdah Ranaghat railway line that stretches between Kolkata district, North 24 Parganas district and Nadia district. This railway currently has 4 tracks from Sealdah to Naihati Junction and 2 tracks from Naihati Junction to Ranaghat Junction.

The track at this station, belonging to the Sealdah - Ranaghat railway, is classified as C-class track, is not a speed classification. But it is used for suburban rail services in metropolitan areas.

Station complex
The railway platform is almost fully sheltered. At the station, the building for station management and the station master's building are located adjacent to the platform no.1. Passengers are issued tickets from that platform by station ticket officers for train travel. The station has seating, toilet, drinking water facilities for passenger convenience.

Water is available in all the 4 platforms, while toilets are available in 2 platforms only. There are three approach roads to the station. The north station road directly goes to platform no. 1. The South and East station roads meet the respective subway gates to the station.

There is a subway and foot over-bridge for crossing. Parking facility is also available for motorcycles and bicycles at the station.

Electrification
Most local passenger trains are electric trains and run on the tracks of Agarpara railway station. Electrification of this railway through the Sealdah–Ranaghat line was completed in 1963–1965.

Securities 
All the responsibilities of station management are given to the head of the station "Station Master". Apart from this, temporary mobile GRP personnel are employed for the security of the station and its premises. Station's adjoining areas security is provided by the local police administration.

See also 

 Sodpur railway station
 Belgharia railway station
 Dum Dum Junction railway station
 Sealdah railway station
 Howrah railway station, the oldest and the busiest railway station of India.

References

External links

 

Sealdah railway division
Railway stations in North 24 Parganas district
Transport in Kolkata
Kolkata Suburban Railway stations